Shana Van Glabeke (born 28 September 1993) is a Belgian former professional racing cyclist. In 2015 she rode for Team Hitec Products and in 2016 and 2017 for Lares–Waowdeals.

See also
 List of 2015 UCI Women's Teams and riders

References

External links
 

1993 births
Living people
Belgian female cyclists
Sportspeople from Ghent
Cyclists from East Flanders
21st-century Belgian women